1F may refer to:

 California Proposition 1F (2009)
 (−1)F, an operator in quantum mechanics
 1 (F) Sqn or No. 1 Squadron RAF, a squadron of the Royal Air Force
 K. 1f, Mozart's brief Minuet in C notated in Nannerl Notenbuch
 5-HT1F receptor or 5-hydroxytryptamine (serotonin) receptor 1F
 Fukushima I Nuclear Power Plant or 1F
 "1F", a song by American rock band White Reaper from their 2019 album You Deserve Love

See also
F1 (disambiguation)